Front Without Flanks is a 1975 Soviet war film directed by Igor Gostev.

The film is the first part in a trilogy directed by Igor Gostev about partisan resistance against the Nazi occupation of the Soviet Union during WWII. The second part is Front Beyond the Front Line (1977). The third part is Front in the Rear of the Enemy (1981). All three screenplays were written by KGB Officer Semyon Tsvigun.

Vyacheslav Tikhonov starred as Soviet Army Officer Mlynsky, the commander of the partisan group in all three films.

Plot 
The film takes place in August, 1941. The Red Army is moving east. Major Mlynsky leads a detachment that begins to fight the invaders in the rear lines.

Cast 
 Vyacheslav Tikhonov as Ivan Mlynskiy
 Oleg Zhakov as Matvey Yegorovich
 Aleksandr Denisov as Vakulenchuk
 Tofik Mirzoyev as Gasan Aliyev
 Semyon Morozov as Seryogin
 Galina Polskikh as Zina
 Aleksey Borzunov as leytenant Petrenko
 Ivan Pereverzev as Pavel
 Yevgeny Shutov
 Vladimir Ivashov as Afanasyev

References

External links 
 

1975 films
1970s Russian-language films
Soviet drama films
1975 drama films